Albert Road Bridge Halt (sometimes called Highland Road) was an intermediate station situated on the Southsea Railway, between Jessie Road Bridge Halt and East Southsea.

The Southsea Railway opened on 1 July 1885, and on that line, Albert Road Bridge Halt was opened on 1 July 1904 and closed a decade later on 6 August 1914, it was part of a concerted effort to boost revenue and thus see off competition from the burgeoning tramway network. The Southsea Railway was jointly owned by the London and South Western Railway and the London, Brighton and South Coast Railway, and very unusually, the two companies ran the line in alternate years. The final nail in the line's coffin was a government directive issued shortly after the declaration of war that railways unable to support themselves would cease operations at the earliest opportunity; and, as the line clearly fell into this category, the last train ran early in August 1914.

See also 
 List of closed railway stations in Britain

References

Further reading

External links 
Intermediate halts listed
Bibliography

Disused railway stations in Portsmouth
Former Portsmouth and Ryde Joint Railway stations
Railway stations in Great Britain opened in 1904
Railway stations in Great Britain closed in 1914